Kendra on Top is an American reality television series on WE tv that debuted June 5, 2012. The series follows the day-to-day life of former Playboy model and The Girls Next Door reality television personality Kendra Baskett as she balances motherhood and her business ventures. Season 2 chronicles Wilkinson as she prepares and participates as a celebrity contestant on Splash and stars on Celebrity Wife Swap. The series also documents the activities of her husband, Hank Baskett, as he works on his transition from NFL football player to businessman. Kendra's car accident that occurred in April 2013 is also included.

The show ran for six seasons until 2017.

Production
From June 2009 through November 2011, Kendra Wilkinson starred on Kendra, a reality series that aired on E!. Upon the conclusion of the series' fourth season, the network and Wilkinson parted ways as the network "went in a different direction" with its programming. In March 2012, WE tv confirmed that the network had ordered fourteen episodes of Kendra on Top. Production began later that month. On October 22, 2012, AMC Networks, the owners of WE tv, announced that the series has been renewed for a second season. Along with the renewal, it was revealed that the first season acquired 7.5 million total viewers. Season 2 premiered on September 13, 2013. As with the first season, it is bookended by hour-long premiere and finale episodes.

Cast

Main
 Kendra Wilkinson
 Hank Baskett, Kendra's husband
 Hank Baskett IV, Kendra and Hank's son
 Alijah Mary Baskett, Kendra and Hank's daughter

Recurring
 Bethany Coffee, Kendra's friend
 Jessica Hall, Kendra's friend
 Travelle Gaines, Hank's friend
 Patti Wilkinson, Kendra's mother
 Eric Wilkinson, Kendra's father
 Colin Wilkinson, Kendra's brother
 Amy Wilkinson, Eric's wife
 Jai Rodriguez, Kendra's friend and vegas co-star

Guest

 Caitlyn Jenner – Season 2, episode 9: "Truce or Dare"
 Jimmy Bullard – Season 4, episode 1: "A Hard Night's Day"
 Kaye Adams – Season 4, episode 1: "A Hard Night's Day"
 Coleen Nolan – Season 4, episode 1: "A Hard Night's Day"
 Jamelia – Season 4, episode 1: "A Hard Night's Day"
 Janet Street-Porter – Season 4, episode 1: "A Hard Night's Day"
 Gemma Collins – Season 4, episode 1: "A Hard Night's Day"
 Jake Quickenden – Season 4, episode 2: "A London Bridge Too Far"
 Matt Edmondson – Season 4, episode 2: "A London Bridge Too Far"
 Stephen Mulhern – Season 4, episode 3: "Homeward Boundage"
 Alex Brooker – Season 4, episode 3: "Homeward Boundage"
 James Anderson – Season 4, episode 3: "Homeward Boundage"
 Jenni "JWoww" Farley – Season 4, episode 6: "Assistant Living"
 Jaleel White – Season 4, episode 6: "Assistant Living"
 Barry Williams – Season 4, episode 6: "Assistant Living"
 Dean Cain – Season 4, episode 6: "Assistant Living"
 Chris Soules – Season 4, episode 6: "Assistant Living"
 Rachael Ray – Season 4, episode 8: "Thirsty Is the New Kendra"
 Anne Burrell – Season 4, episode 8: "Thirsty Is the New Kendra"
 Jayde Nicole – Season 5, episode 1: "Return of the Jayde-Eye"
 Louis Vito – Season 5, episode 2: "Snowblinded"
 Bridget Marquardt – Season 5, episode 12: "A Bridget Too Far"

Episodes

Series overview

Season 1 (2012)

Season 2 (2013)

Season 3 (2014)

Season 4 (2015)

Season 5 (2016)

Season 6 (2017)

References

External links
 

2010s American reality television series
2012 American television series debuts
English-language television shows
Television shows set in Los Angeles
American television spin-offs
Reality television spin-offs
2017 American television series endings